Loving Frank  is a 2007 American novel by Nancy Horan. It tells the story of Mamah Borthwick and her illicit love affair with Frank Lloyd Wright amidst the public shame they experienced in early twentieth century America. This fictional account told from a new perspective, that of little-known Mamah, is based on research conducted by first time novelist, Nancy Horan. It relates events in Mamah’s life as it became inextricably intertwined with that of Wright between the years of 1907 through 1914. By following the artistic aspirations and travels of the two main protagonists, the novel sheds light on the social mores of the times in the U.S. and Europe.

Plot summary

The book opens to notes written by Mamah Borthwick, reminiscing on her life and expressing her longing to tell her views of what happened. The story begins with an account of Mamah’s attendance, with great trepidation, at a public talk in  Oak Park given by Frank Lloyd Wright, the famous architect of the  Chicago School. The author tells us that some years earlier, Wright had designed Mamah's house at the insistence of her husband Edwin Cheney. We learn of the already tumultuous and intermittent affair between Wright and Mamah, which began with their working together on the architectural plans for the house.

The novel is an intricate analysis of Mamah's emotional torments as an intellectual in her own right, wife, mother, friend, and member of society. It also touches on the human aspects of Wright in addition to his artistic talent and eccentricities. Throughout the novel, Mamah explains the artistic or philosophical underpinnings of Wright's extravagant views. We experience the poignancy of both of their family situations and internal conflicts. The novel allows the reader to see Wright through the prism of Mamah’s deep admiration. The Swedish feminist Ellen Key rightfully unnerves the female protagonist when she declares that Mamah may have cowardly followed Wright in order to bask in his brilliance rather than accomplishing anything she can claim her own.

Themes
Women's Independence “Before Mamah came over to Germany, Mattie had said to her, “What will you do if Frank returns to his wife? You’ll have nothing.” But Mamah felt now that if that came to be, she had more than nothing. "All the rest, it seemed, had just floated away.” (Horan 185). Mamah Borthwick Cheney was a pathbreaker for women’s independence. She struggled to discover how a woman who wanted her own self-expression could "fulfill the traditional-bound, justly demanding needs of her children” (New York Times 03). “Mamah, a brilliant woman with a college degree, was not suited to the role allotted to educated women of her time. She simply could not breathe” (Los Angeles Times 01). Mamah is “a symbol of both the freedoms women yearn to have and of the consequences that may await when they try to take them” (New York Times 03).
Reputation "Mrs. Cheney and Wright Elope Again. Famous Chicago Architect Lives with Divorcee in Seclusion at Hillside, Wis.; Leaves Wife at Home Forgiven After First Escapade, He Now Tacks Rent Sign on Residence” (Horan 241).  The love affair between Frank Lloyd Wright and Mamah Borthwick Cheney both “shocked Chicago society and forever changed their lives” (Random House 02). Frank and Mamah left a lot behind them when the fled Oak Park for Europe in 1909. Two spouses and nine children were left between the two of them. The effects of their affair were wide spreading, and not just within their own families. “Beyond its shock value, the outcome would have ramifications . . . for architects, feminists, criminologists and armchair moralists of every stripe” (International Herald Tribune 02). 
Morality  “Mamah Cheney followed her heart at any cost” (Los Angeles Times 01). “As she leaves her home and children, she examines and reexamines the moral basis of her choice” (Los Angeles 01). She is no longer in love with her husband, Edwin, and is ready to begin living her own life, rather than living a role assigned to her by society. “She feels completely reborn in body and mind through her relationship with Wright” (Los Angeles 01).

Characters
Mamah Borthwick:  Full name Martha Bouton Borthwick Cheney.  Involved in affair with famous architect Frank Lloyd Wright.  Well educated and advocate for women rights.  Mamah is the protagonist of the book.  Leaves her children to go to Europe with Wright.  Struggles to come to terms with everything. Murdered by Julian Carlton.

Frank Lloyd Wright: Brilliant architect.  Involved in affair with Mamah.  Wright's mother considered him a favorite and pampered him as a child.  He considers himself so fascinating and quite a genius that people should be honored to work with him.  He often spends money he doesn't have.

Catherine Wright:   Wright's wife.  Refused to divorce him despite ongoing and long-term affair.

Edwin Cheney: Mamah's husband.  Loyal to Mamah but allows divorce.

Martha Cheney:  Mamah’s and Edwin's daughter.  When Mamah leaves, she is too young to remember much about her mother.

John Cheney:  Mamah’s and Edwin's son.  John was very close with his mother before she left.  When his mother returns, she finds that he also has changed.

Lizzie Borthwick:  Mamah's sister.  A devoted sister who remains single and lives in the Cheneys’ household, Lizzie takes care of Mamah's children before and after she leaves.

Jessie Borthwick:  Mamah's sister who died from complications during child birth.

Dickie Bock:  Artist who worked for Wright at Oak Park Studio.

Marion Mahony Griffin:  Female architect who worked with Wright.

Robert Herrick:  Mamah's professor at the University of Chicago.

Mattie Brown:  Mamah's close childhood friend.  Mattie dies shortly after giving birth to a child.

Alden Brown:  Mattie's husband.  A miner.

Ernst Wasmuth:  Worked with Wright as a German publisher intent on publicizing Wright’s architectural ideas in Europe. Result was a two-volume folio of 100 lithographs known as the Wasmuth Portfolio.

Ellen Key:  a renowned advocate for the women's movement in Europe. Based in Sweden. Inspires Mamah and engages her to translate her work.

Walter Burley Griffin:  architect who worked with Wright in Chicago.  Wright owed him money.  Married Marion Mahony.

Taylor Woolley:  architect who worked with Wright in Europe. A good friend of both Wright’s and Mamah's.

Else Lasker-Schuler:  Poet who befriended Mamah at Cafe des Westens in Germany where she taught and took classes in languages.

Jennie Porter:  Wright's sister.  Has a son named Frankie.

Billy Weston:  workman for Wright at Taliesin.

Anna Wright:  Wright's mother.  Smart woman who pampered Wright as a child and adult.

Josiah:  young carpenter apprentice for Wright at Taliesin.

Elinor Millor Cheney:  Edwin's 2nd wife.

Emil Brodelle:  Wright's drafting man at Taliesin.

Gertrude Carlton:  cook and married to Julian Carlton.

Julian Carlton:  Employed by Wright at Taliesin.  When released by Mamah he goes crazy and kills Mamah, her two children, and two of Wright's workmen.  Attempts suicide.  Dies in prison due to starvation.

John Lloyd Wright:  Wright's son. Works with Wright on some projects.

Wright's architecture

Several important buildings by Frank Lloyd Wright that played a role in Loving Frank.

Frank Lloyd Wright Home and Studio:  located in Oak Park.  Designed to be open in his Prairie Style.Frank Lloyd Wright Home and Studio 
Edwin H. Cheney House: The house Wright helped Mamah and Edwin design.

Tan-Y-Deri:  Wright's sister home.  Means "Under the Oaks".

Taliesin:  Home Wright builds for his life with Mamah.  Burned down by Julian Carlton but later rebuilt by Wright.  Photo is of the part of Taliesin burned in 1914.

Sources
Horan, Nancy. Loving Frank, New York, NY: Ballantine Books, 2008.
Maslin, Janet. International Herald Tribune Book Review: Loving Frank. 03 Aug. 2007. 26 Oct. 2008 <http://www.iht.com/articles/2007/08/03/arts/06book.php>.
"Random House, Inc." Loving Frank. 26 Oct. 2008 <http://www.randomhouse.com/catalog/display.pperl/9780345502254.html>.
Schillinger, Liesl. New York Times, Notes on a Scandal. 23 Sept. 2007. 26 Oct. 2008 <https://www.nytimes.com/2007/09/23/books/review/schillinger-t.html>.
Winik, Marion. Los Angeles Times, Breaking Away. 19 Aug. 2007. 26 Oct. 2008 <http://articles.latimes.com/2007/aug/19/books/bk-winik19>.

2007 American novels
Biographical novels
James Fenimore Cooper Prize-winning works
Novels about architects
Cultural depictions of Frank Lloyd Wright